Harvey Birdman, Attorney at Law is an American adult animated television sitcom created by Michael Ouweleen and Erik Richter for Cartoon Network's late-night programming block, Adult Swim. The first season of Harvey Birdman, Attorney at Law is the first adult animated production to be produced by Cartoon Network Studios. A spin-off of Space Ghost Coast to Coast, the series revolves around the activity of the Sebben & Sebben law firm, which is staffed mainly by superheroes and other characters who had originally been featured in past Hanna-Barbera cartoons, most notably Birdman and the Galaxy Trio.

The pilot first aired as a sneak peek on Cartoon Network on December 30, 2000.

The series officially premiered on Adult Swim on September 2, 2001, the night the block launched. It ended on July 22, 2007, with a total of 39 episodes, over the course of four seasons. The entire series has been made available on DVD, and other forms of home media, including on-demand streaming.

A special, entitled Harvey Birdman: Attorney General, premiered on October 15, 2018, and a spin-off, Birdgirl, premiered on April 5, 2021.

Premise

Harvey Birdman, Attorney at Law features ex-superhero Harvey Birdman of Birdman and the Galaxy Trio as an attorney working for a law firm alongside other cartoon stars from the 1960s and 1970s Hanna-Barbera cartoon series. Harvey's clients are also primarily characters taken from the Hanna-Barbera cartoon series of the same era.

Many of Birdman's nemeses from his former cartoon series appear as attorneys, often representing the opposing side of a given case. Harvey usually fills the role of a criminal defense attorney, though he will act as a civil litigator or other similar roles when the plot calls for it.

The series uses a surrealist style of comedy, featuring characters, objects, and jokes that are briefly introduced and rarely (if ever) referenced thereafter. Because the series relies heavily on popular culture references to classic television animation, Harvey Birdman, Attorney at Law constantly delves into parody, featuring clips of these series or specially created scenes which mimic the distinctive style of the animation being referenced.

Harvey Birdman, Attorney at Law is the first Williams Street cartoon to maintain continuity through the entire series. Various episodes reference Harvey's (or another superhero's) former crime-fighting career. The episode "Turner Classic Birdman" serves to bridge the gap between Birdman and the Galaxy Trio and Harvey Birdman, Attorney at Law.

Much of the humor is derived from giving superheroes and supervillains more eccentric qualities, such as transforming mad scientist Dr. Myron Reducto into a paranoid prosecutor. Several of the plots revolve around popular myths about classic Hanna-Barbera characters, such as Shaggy and Scooby-Doo being recreational drug users.

Voice cast
 Gary Cole as Harvey Birdman, Judge Hiram Mightor
 Stephen Colbert as Phil Ken Sebben, Myron Reducto
 Joe Alaskey as Peter Potamus (first appearance only), Number One
 Thomas Michael Allen as Peanut
 Paget Brewster as Judy Ken Sebben/Birdgirl
 Grey DeLisle as Debbie, Daphne Blake, Dr. Gale Melody, Mary
 Chris Edgerly as Peter Potamus (every other appearance), DVD, Mr. Finkerton, The Funky Phantom, Tinker, Tod Devlin, Augie Doggie, Barracuda, Cumulus the Storm King, Captain Caveman, Gorak, Fancy Fancy, Chuck
 John Michael Higgins as Mentok the Mindtaker, Zardo, Grape Ape
 Maurice LaMarche as Azul Falcone, Stan Freezoid, Apache Chief, Fred Flintstone, Yogi Bear, Der Spuzmacher, Inch High, Speed Buggy, Hi-Riser, Doggie Daddy, Droopy, Quick Draw McGraw, Wally Gator, Morocco Mole, Vince, Cavey Jr., Magilla Gorilla, Mr. Peebles, Benny the Ball, Dum Dum, Shazzan, Atom Ant, Nitron
 Peter MacNicol as X the Eliminator
 Michael McKean as Evelyn Spyro Throckmorton
 Matt Peccini as The Bear
 Neil Ross as Vulturo, Dr. Benton Quest, Ding-A-Ling Wolf
 Debi Mae West as Gigi
 Paul Adelstein as Murro the Marauder
 Jack Angel as General
 Dee Bradley Baker as Jonny Quest, Lizard Man
 Michael Bell as Zan
 Jeff Bergman as George Jetson (in "Shaggy Busted"), Old Man Bakov, Clown
 Mary Birdsong as Chibo, Tana
 Lewis Black as Elliott the Deadly Duplicator
 Steven Blum as Yakky Doodle, Clamhead, Stavros
 Patience Cleveland as Tangy Devlin
 Bill Farmer as Secret Squirrel
 Keith Ferguson as Bill Ken Sebben
 Nika Futterman as Debbie
 Mark Hamill as Ricochet Rabbit
 Toby Huss as Ernie Devlin, Shado
 Scott Innes as Shaggy Rogers, Scooby-Doo, Scrappy-Doo
 Tom Kenny as Boo-Boo Bear, Elroy Jetson, Top Cat, Choo Choo, Computer Voice
 David Koechner as Cubby McQuilken
 Phil LaMarr as Black Vulcan
 Steve Landesberg as Bailiff, Grok, Doctor Quincy
 Tress MacNeille as Wilma Flintstone, Pebbles Flintstone
 Diane Michelle as Jane Jetson, Orbitty
 Laraine Newman as Sybil Schussler
 Rob Paulsen as Baba Looey
 Thom Pinto as Race Bannon
 Doug Preis as Thundarr the Barbarian, Beegle Beagle
 Kevin Michael Richardson as Barney Rubble
 Erik Richter as Tibetan Monk, Chunga, Gokk
 André Sogliuzzo as Dynomutt
 Fred Tatasciore as Nikos
 B.J. Ward as Velma Dinkley
 Frank Welker as Fred Jones, Jabberjaw, Biff, Robot, Avenger
 Billy West as Dr. Zin
 Kym Whitley as Norlissa
 Wally Wingert as Hadji, George Jetson (in "Back to the Present"), Astro, Harry Twiddles, Moby Dick

Episodes

Production
Harvey Birdman, Attorney at Law creators Michael Ouweleen and Erik Richter were originally writers for Space Ghost Coast to Coast, which is where the titular character made his debut. The show was Adult Swim's most expensive original series at the time, and is the most expensive spin-off of Space Ghost Coast to Coast.

Although the first season was animated using digital ink and paint, the remaining seasons were animated using Adobe After Effects. The reason for the switch was that the animation studio was having difficulty maintaining the fast pace of the show, and thus the production of episodes slowed down due to constant retakes.

By animating the later episodes at Turner Studios in Atlanta with Adobe Flash, not only were problems corrected more quickly, but production costs were much lower.

International broadcast
In Canada, Harvey Birdman, Attorney At Law previously aired on Teletoon's Teletoon at Night block and later G4's Adult Digital Distraction block. The series currently airs on the Canadian version of Adult Swim.

Special

On May 14, 2018, it was announced that there would be an upcoming special based on the series entitled Harvey Birdman: Attorney General. In the special, Harvey Birdman becomes the next Attorney General of the United States, under President Phil Ken Sebben. The original voice cast returned for the special. It premiered at midnight on October 15, 2018.

Reception
In 2009, Harvey Birdman, Attorney at Law was named the 91st-best animated series by IGN. They called the concept of the show "wonderful" and the show as a whole "especially clever." The review summarized that "Harvey Birdman worked as both a parody and homage to these animated characters we know and love, with plenty of funny, surreal jokes along the way."

Home media

Each DVD is in the shape of a law book. Each season's box art is nearly identical, and the only change for each season is the background colour (Volume One is brown purple, Volume Two is blue, and Volume Three is black). The small picture next to the title and the title itself also appears different. In April 2005, Adult Swim had a "Do Our Work For Us" contest for Harvey Birdman Season 1 on DVD. The objective of the contest was to ask viewers to make their own fan-made promo commercial for the upcoming DVD.

Music
The theme song is an edited version of the song "Slow Moody Blues" written by Reg Tilsley. Other notable songs used in the show include Charlie Steinman's "It Is Such A Good Night" (also known as "Scoobidoo Love") and a lyricless version of Gianni Morandi's "La Mia Mania" (also known as "Okay Maria").

Video game

A video game based on the series has been released for the PlayStation 2, Wii and PlayStation Portable video game consoles. It was developed by High Voltage Software and published by Capcom, with gameplay mechanics similar to Capcom's Ace Attorney series. It was released on January 8, 2008, and includes five new, interactive cases.

References

External links

 
 Online Channel Australia
 
 IGN's 10 Questions: Harvey Birdman
 IGN's review of the DVD set, Harvey Birdman: Attorney at Law, Volume 1

 
2000s American adult animated television series
2000s American legal television series
2000s American parody television series
2000s American sitcoms
2000s American superhero comedy television series
2000s American surreal comedy television series
2000s American workplace comedy television series
2000 American television series debuts
2007 American television series endings
Animated adult television sitcoms
American adult animated television spin-offs
American adult animated comedy television series
American adult animated superhero television series
American animated sitcoms
American flash adult animated television series
Television series by Cartoon Network Studios
Crossover animated television series
English-language television shows
Adult Swim original programming
Space Ghost Coast to Coast
Television series by Williams Street